The Hongqi E-QM5 is a purpose built electric compact executive sedan made by Hongqi for online car-hailing.

Overview

The Hongqi E-QM5 was first shown at the 2021 Haikou International New Energy Vehicle and Connected Mobility Show. 

The E-QM5 shares the underpinnings of the Hongqi H5 gasoline-powered sedan with MacPherson struts at the front end and multi-link suspension at the rear, and dimensions of 5,040 mm/1,910 mm/1,569 mm, with a 2,990 mm wheelbase.

A battery-swap-enabled version called E-QH5 was also planned.

Performance
Reports suggests that later versions of the model could be equipped with blade batteries supplied by BYD.

Design
The exterior design was done under the lead by ex-Rolls-Royce design head Giles Taylor, who has been hired by the Chinese automaker Hongqi since his departure from Rolls-Royce from 2019.

See also
Hongqi
Hongqi H5

References

Cars introduced in 2021
Cars of China
E-QM5
Production electric cars
Sedans
Front-wheel-drive vehicles
Mid-size cars
Taxi vehicles
Electric taxis